Deep integration, as defined by Simone Claar and Andrea Nölke, means trade agreements which not only contain rules on tariffs and conventional non-tariff trade restrictions, but which also regulate the business environment in a more general sense. Issues of deep integration include competition policy, investor rights, product standards, public procurement and intellectual property rights, for example.

Canada and United States
Deep integration can also specifically refer to the harmonization of policies and regulations of Canada and the United States.

Chile, Colombia, Mexico and Peru
In 2011, Chile, Colombia, Mexico and Peru initiated steps to create a Deep Integration bloc.

It is called "The Pacific Alliance".

References

See also
 Independent Task Force on North America
 Security and Prosperity Partnership of North America
 Trade, Investment and Labour Mobility Agreement
 North American Forum

Canada–United States relations
Economic integration